The word satama is Finnish for harbor.

Satama may also refer to:

 Satama-Sokoro, a town in Côte d'Ivoire.
 Satama-Sokoura, a town in Côte d'Ivoire.
 Sosiaalikeskus Satama, a social center in Helsinki.
 Wanha Satama, an exhibition center in Helsinki.